The Robert H. Sunday House is located in Marshalltown, Iowa, United States.  It was designed by Frank Lloyd Wright in the Usonian style, and was listed on the National Register of Historic Places in 1988.  Initially the Sunday's choose the Usonian Automatic, a natural concrete block model, for their home.  When it provided unworkable, Wright sent the plans for this house. In style and materials it is very similar to the 1953 Usonian Exhibition House.  It was the sixth of seven houses designed by Wright and built in this style in Iowa.  Sunday, who owned Marshall Lumber in Marshalltown, acted as his own general contractor.  In fact, he and his wife did much of the work themselves.  It is also believed to be last of this style built in brick.  John H. "Jack" Howe, a Wright assistant who supervised the initial construction, designed an addition to this house in 1970 that conforms seamlessly with the original.  It includes the family room, family room terrace, and the dining room.  The original house followed an "L" shaped plan, and with the addition it is now a "T" shaped plan.  Howe had previously designed (1964) the building for Sunday's business.

References

 Storrer, William Allin. The Frank Lloyd Wright Companion. University Of Chicago Press, 2006,  (S.393)

External links
Exterior photographs of the Sunday house

Houses completed in 1960
Houses on the National Register of Historic Places in Iowa
National Register of Historic Places in Marshall County, Iowa
Houses in Marshall County, Iowa
Frank Lloyd Wright buildings
Buildings and structures in Marshalltown, Iowa
Modernist architecture in Iowa